Springdale Farms is a family owned farmers' market, located on Springdale Road in Cherry Hill, New Jersey, United States. , this was Cherry Hill's last working farm.

History
Springdale Farms began in 1949, when Alan Ebert purchased the land. At the time, three quarters of Cherry Hill was covered with farmland. Alan's widow Mary, along with her children, took over operations of the  farm after his death. A fire in 1988 destroyed the farm's  retail building.

In late 1998, Springdale Road was widened from two lanes to four lanes, including a center left-turn lane. This affected the farm by not only removing some of the farm's property, but also affecting the farm's business when the road had a detour that motorists used during the widening project. In 1999, the farm expanded to add three greenhouses, totaling 9,600 square feet, where baked goods, crafts and other farm products are sold. In 2006, a fence was constructed in response to the significant number of deer in the forest area surrounding the farm.

References

External links

Virtual tour

Buildings and structures in Camden County, New Jersey
Cherry Hill, New Jersey
Farms in New Jersey
Tourist attractions in Camden County, New Jersey
1949 establishments in New Jersey